Doğanköy is a village in the Pervari District of Siirt Province in Turkey. The village is populated by Kurds of the Goyan tribe and had a population of 2,356 in 2021.

The three hamlets of Ilısu, İnceler and Karamik are attached to Doğanköy.

References 

Villages in Pervari District
Kurdish settlements in Siirt Province